The Inzel is a right tributary of the river Aiud in Romania. It flows into the Aiud in Poiana Aiudului.

References

Rivers of Alba County
Rivers of Romania